Shambhu railway station a railway station on Ambala–Attari line under Ambala railway division of Northern Railway zone. This is situated beside National Highway 44 at Bapraur, Shambhu in Patiala district in the Indian state of Punjab.

History
Amritsar–Attari line was completed in 1862. the electrification of the line was completed in different period. Shahbad Markanda-Mandi Gobindgarh sector was electrified in 1995–96, the Mandi Gobindgarh–Ludhiana sector in 1996–97, the Phillaur–Phagwara sector in 2002–03 and the Phagwara–Jallandhar City–Amritsar in 2003–04.

References

Railway stations in Patiala district
Ambala railway division
Railway stations opened in 1870